Sapindus  is a genus of about five to twelve species of shrubs and small trees in the lychee family, Sapindaceae, native to warm temperate to tropical regions of the world. The genus includes both deciduous and evergreen species. Members of the genus are commonly known as soapberries or soapnuts because the fruit pulp is used to make soap. The generic name is derived from the Latin words sapo, meaning "soap", and indicus, meaning "of India".

The flowers form in large panicles, each flower small, creamy white. The fruit is a small leathery-skinned drupe  in diameter, yellow ripening blackish, containing one to three seeds.

Uses 

The drupes (soapnuts) contain saponins, which have surfactant properties, having been used for washing by ancient Asian and American peoples. A number of other uses for Sapindus have also been reported such making arrows from the wood and decorative objects from the seeds.

Folk medicine 
Leaf and fruit extracts of Sapindus have historically been used in folk remedies to treat various conditions.

Insecticide 
Sapindus species are used as food plants by the larvae of some Lepidoptera (moths and butterflies) species including Endoclita malabaricus. Kernel extracts of soapnut disrupt the activity of enzymes of larvae and pupae and inhibits the growth of the mosquito Aedes aegypti, an important vector of viral diseases.

Dyeing agent 
Soapnut is used as a dyeing agent for coloring the yarn of Tussar silk and cotton.

Species 

The number of species is disputed between different authors, particularly in North America where between one and three species are accepted.
 Sapindus delavayi (China, India)
 Sapindus detergens (syn. var. Soapnut, Ritha)
 Sapindus emarginatus Vahl (Southern Asia)
 Sapindus laurifolius Vahl – Ritha (India)
 Sapindus marginatus Willd. – Florida Soapberry (Florida to South Carolina); included in S. saponaria by some authors.
 Sapindus mukorossi Gaertn. – Indian Soapberry (India east to the Himalayas)
 Sapindus oahuensis Hillebr. ex Radlk. –  Lonomea (Kauaʻi and Oʻahu, Hawaii)
 Sapindus rarak DC. (Southeast Asia)
 Sapindus saponaria L.
S. s. var. drummondii (Hook. & Arn.) L.D.Benson – Western Soapberry (southwestern United States, Mexico)
S. s. var. saponaria – Wingleaf Soapberry (southeastern United States, Caribbean, island of Hawaiʻi, Central and South America)
 Sapindus tomentosus (China)
 Sapindus trifoliatus L. – South India Soapnut or Three-leaf Soapberry (Southern India, Pakistan)
 Sapindus vitiensis A.Gray (American Samoa, Samoa, Fiji)

Formerly placed here 
Lepisanthes fruticosa (Roxb.) Leenh. (as S. fruticosus Roxb.)
Lepisanthes senegalensis (Juss. ex Poir.) Leenh. (as S. senegalensis Juss. ex Poir.)
Lepisanthes tetraphylla (Vahl) Radlk. (as S. tetraphylla Vahl)
Talisia cerasina (Benth.) Radlk. (as S. cerasinus Benth.)
Talisia esculenta (A.St.-Hil.) Radlk. (as S. esculenta A.St.-Hil.)

References

External links 

 Flora of India: Sapindus
 Flora of Pakistan: Sapindus
 Flora of China: Sapindus species list

 
Sapindaceae genera
Taxa named by Carl Linnaeus